Stathmonotus lugubris, the Mexican worm blenny, is a species of chaenopsid blenny known from southern Mexico, in the eastern central Pacific ocean.

References
 Böhlke, J.E., 1953 (25 Nov.) A new stathmonotid blenny from the Pacific coast of Mexico. Zoologica, Scientific Contributions of the New York Zoological Society v. 38 (pt 3, no. 11): 145–149.

lugubris
Fish described in 1953